Beretbinə is a village and the least populous municipality in the Zaqatala Rayon of Azerbaijan. It has a population of 178.

References 

Populated places in Zaqatala District